The 2018 Slovak local elections were held on Saturday, 10 November 2018, to elect deputies to municipality councils, city councils and mayors, including mayors of boroughs and members of their councils in Bratislava and Košice.

The turnout slightly increased compared to last elections in 2014 to 48.67%. The highest turnout rate was recorded in Prešov Region (53.18%), and the lowest turnout rate in Bratislava Region (43.74%). Locally the highest percentage of votes cast was in Chorváty, Košice-okolie District (89.88%, 80 out of 89), and the lowest in Košice's borough Luník IX (19.44%, 862 out of 4,434).

In 762 cities and municipalities, only one candidate ran for mayor, therefore, these candidates needed only one vote to be elected. These included two cities with more than 20,000 inhabitants, Brezno and Šaľa. In five municipalities, there was no candidate for mayor.

Electoral system 
The commune elections in Slovakia use the one-round system for all elected seats. Mayoral elections utilize the first-past-the-post voting system compared to local councils where voters choose from the list same number of candidates as are representing theirs electoral district. The candidates with the highest number of votes are elected.

Overall results 

The following tables summarize the elected mayors and council deputies by their party affiliation.

Mayor elections

Council deputies

Results in major cities

Bratislava 

The incumbent mayor Ivo Nesrovnal elected as independent candidate decided to run for second term. However, he was defeated by architect and civil activist Matúš Vallo, supported by Progressive Slovakia and Together - Civic Democracy who became new mayor and defeated another independent candidate and former director-general of Radio and Television of Slovakia, Václav Mika.

Out of 17 new elected mayors of boroughs were 10 independent candidates and 7 candidates with the support of different centre-right coalitions - each with Freedom and Solidarity, We Are Family and New Majority.

Košice 

The previous mayor, 2014-elected Richard Raši (SMER-SD), resigned from office after his appointment to new government as Deputy Prime Minister. Responsibility for the mayor office was taken over by Martin Petruško (SMER-SD). The campaign was influenced by rumored child harassment scandal of opposition candidate, Jaroslav Polaček that caused his loss of support from few major political parties. These rumors were later demented and Polaček won the election.

Out of 22 new elected mayors of boroughs were 13 independent candidates, 7 candidates with the support of different centre-right coalitions - each with Freedom and Solidarity and Christian Democratic Movement, 1 candidate of Direction – Social Democracy and 1 from Party of the Romani Coalition.

Prešov 

Andrea Turčanová - the incumbent mayor elected with support of center-right coalition confirmed in February 2018 intention to candidate for re-election. Her biggest rival was the former mayor (2006-2014) and independent candidate Pavel Hagyari.

Žilina 

Mayor of Žilina - Igor Choma (SMER-SD) announced he was not going to run for re-election. On the other hand, in Žilina occurred increased number of independent candidates elected to council. Election was won by Peter Fiabáne (NEKA) who was externally supported by both liberal and conservative center-right parties.

Banská Bystrica

References 

Elections in Slovakia
2018 elections in Europe
November 2018 events in Europe
2018 in Slovakia
Local elections in Slovakia